Scott Muller may refer to:
Scott Muller (cricketer) (born 1971), Australian cricketer
Scott Muller (canoeist) (born 1970), Panamanian-American slalom canoer